Ayran Dibi (also Englishd as ‘Ayran Dibi) is a village in Harzandat-e Gharbi Rural District, in the Central District of Marand County, East Azerbaijan Province, Iran. At the 2006 census, its population was 1,499, in 357 families.

References 

Populated places in Marand County